Batoni may refer to:

 Batoni (title), a Georgian honorific
 Batoni, Italy, a hamlet
 Pompeo Batoni, Italian painter